Sukhjit Kaur Sahi is an Indian politician and member of the Bharatiya Janata Party. Sahi is a member of the Punjab Legislative Assembly from the Dasuya constituency in Hoshiarpur district. She was the wife of Amarjit Singh Sahi. She has a son named Harsimrat Singh Sahi and a daughter named Yasmeen. Yasmeen is married to a lawyer named Sidak Sandhu.

References 

People from Hoshiarpur district
Bharatiya Janata Party politicians from Punjab
Members of the Punjab Legislative Assembly
Living people
21st-century Indian politicians
Year of birth missing (living people)